All You've Got is a 2006 sport/drama film directed by Neema Barnette and starring stars Ciara Harris and Adrienne Bailon. The film debuted on MTV.

Plot summary
A rivalry between two volleyball teams (the Phantoms and the Madonnas) causes a big catastrophe when the two teams collide.

Gabby Espinoza (Adrienne Bailon) is captain of the Cathedral High Phantoms volleyball team. Her mother died when she was little, and recently, a fire claimed the life of her firefighter father. Coincidentally, the fire was in the Madonna's school (the Phantoms' rival).

Having to go to different schools and split up, the three Madonnas Lauren McDonald, Katilin, and Becca chose Cathedral High and joined the volleyball team. Tension forms between Gabby's group Lettie and Rada and the Madonnas, causing them to lose during a volleyball game because of lack of teamwork. This makes the coach furious and he makes a speech about working together as a team and feeling the love. Soon after, the girls begin to warm up to one another and at the same time, winning game after game. Lauren's friendship with the other girls, particularly with Gabby, makes Becca jealous and in a fit of jealousy, she tells Gabby about Lauren and Artie (Gabby's ex-boyfriend) and a rift between the two escalates. During the game, a fight between Gabby and Lauren occurs. The coach tells them to put their own issues aside and focus on the game. After winning, Gabby and Lauren are back on good terms, agreeing that both should concentrate on their games first and deciding afterwards who should get the boy. Before the game starts, Becca puts Melatonin in Gabby's water bottle. Gabby begins to lose focus, the coach suspects she's on drugs and orders her to sit on the bench, replacing her with Becca. Gabby breaks down and the Phantoms win. Becca confesses to Lauren about what she did, with reason that she wanted her father to get to watch her play. She gets kicked off the team and the Phantoms head on to finals.

With determination, hard work and cooperation, the Phantoms win the championship. Becca makes up with Gabby. Gabby and Lauren didn't care about which one of them gets Artie and the girls set off to make their dreams come true.

Cast
Adrienne Bailon —  Gabby Espinoza
Sarah Wright — Lauren McDonald
Ciara — Becca Watley
Jennifer Peña — Letica "Lettie" Morales
Taylor Cole — Kaitlin
Jackée Harry — butt shorts salesman
Daniella Alonso — Rada Kincaid
Laila Ali — Herself
T-Bone (rapper) — announcer
Barbara Niven — Peggy McDonald
Faizon Love — Coach Harlan
Doug Savant — Sam McDonald
Eduardo Yáñez — Javier Espinoza
George Rodguriez  — assistant volleyball coach
Brendan Kirsch  — madonna volleyball coach
Michael Dorm  — Fireman Captain Diaz
Julissa Bermudez  — cousin Mali
Efren Ramirez  — Carlos
Parker Torress  — Monster
Renee Victor  — Grandmother Rosa
Michael Copon  — Artie Sanchez
Dominique Ianni - The Setter
 Maya Cornejo - Lettie's little sister

Soundtrack
All You've Got (CD/DVD)
 1, 2 Step by Ciara
 12' O Clock by Marques Houston
 Latinos Stand Up by Play-N-Skillz
 Reggaeton Latino by Don Omar
 Summer Nights by Lil Rob
 Baby I'm Back – Baby Bash ft. Akon 
 Bounce – T-Bone 
 B.O.B - OutKast 
 Latin Salsa Mix – T-Bone 
 Follow T – T-Bone 
 Love Should Be A Crime - Michael Copon  
 Obsession – Frankie J 
 Pon De Replay – Rihanna 
 Oye, Mi Canto - N.O.R.E ft Nina Sky and Tego Calderon
 Where Will I Be – Jennifer Pena

References

External links 
 

2006 television films
2006 films
2000s teen drama films
American teen drama films
Volleyball films
2006 drama films
Films directed by Neema Barnette
Films about women's sports
American drama television films
2000s American films